The Ministry of Minority Development and Aukaf is a Ministry of the Government of Maharashtra. which include Muslims, Sikhs, Christians, Buddhists, Zoroastrians (Parsis) and Jains notified as minority communities in The Gazette of India under Section 2(c) of the National Commission for Minorities Act, 1992. for the development of Maharashtra state.

The Ministry is headed by a cabinet level Minister. Eknath Shinde is Current Chief Minister of Maharashtra Minister of Minority Development and Aukaf Government of Maharashtra.

Head office

List of Cabinet Ministers

List of Ministers of State

References 

Government of Maharashtra
Government ministries of Maharashtra